Papua New Guinea is home to several protected areas, which receive protection because of their environmental, cultural or similar value.

The total number of protected areas as 2018 is 71.

The effort by the PNG government to protect biodiversity has resulted in 44 existing terrestrial protected areas using the International Union for the Conservation of Nature and Natural Resources (IUCN) categories. These protected areas account for 1.6% of the total land area. A study of biodiversity identified a further 398 areas as candidates for conservation. This would increase the total protected areas to 16.8% of the total country area.

Included in the PNG protected area list, but not formally recognized by International Union for the Conservation of Nature and Natural Resources (IUCN) is the terrestrial Wildlife Management Area (WMA). WMA is an Integrated Conservation and Development Project (ICAD), which seeks to conserve biological diversity by involving landowners. The idea behind the project is that income generating activities, from the biological diversity would encourage people living in these areas to conserve, because such projects would link the value of these resources to living standard and also access to markets. The progress of WMA's is yet to be evaluated.

Papua New Guinea's first conservation area, the YUS Conservation Area, was established in 2009 on the Huon Peninsula, Morobe Province.

Apart from local conservation efforts, PNG is also a signatory to international conventions and treaties. These international treaties include. The International Plant Protection Convention (1951); Convention on the Prevention of Marine Pollution by Dumping of Wastes and Other Matter (1972); Convention on International Trade in Endangered Species of Wild Fauna and Flora (CITES); Ramsar Convention on Wetlands of International Importance Especially as Waterfowl Habitat (1992); Convention on Biological Diversity (1992) and the Convention on the Conservation of Migratory Species of Wild Animals. PNG is also in partnership with other nations in the Oceania region and is a signatory to the regional Convention on Conservation of Nature in the South Pacific (APIA Convention).

PNG has two listed Ramsar sites: Lake Kutubu and Tonda Wildlife Management Area.

National parks
National parks of Papua New Guinea are distinguished by pristine, untouched environment.

Managed reserves
 Zo-oimaga

Wildlife management areas 
In Papua New Guinea a wildlife management area is the simplest form of protected area, that protects an area of land or water while retaining full power to landowners to manage their land. WMAs are managed by an elected committee formed of customary landowners.

 Tonda Wildlife Management Area, Western Province
 Crater Mountain Wildlife Management Area, Eastern Highlands Province
 Kamiali Wildlife Management Area, Morobe Province
 Lake Kutubu Wildlife Management Area, Southern Highlands Province
 Oi Mada Wara Wildlife Management Area, Goodenough Island, Milne Bay Province
 Sulamesi Wildlife Management Area, Mount Bosavi, Southern Highlands Province
 Maza Wildlife Management Area, Western Province
 Aramba Wildlife Management Area, Western Province
 Wereaver Wildlife Management Area, Western Province
 Libano-Arisai Wildlife Management Area, Mount Bosavi, Southern Highlands Province
 Libano-Hose Wildlife Management Area, Mount Bosavi, Southern Highlands Province
 Neiru (Aird Hills) Wildlife Management Area, Gulf Province

See also 

Conservation in Papua New Guinea
 Environmental issues in Papua New Guinea

References 

protected areas
protected areas
Papua New Guinea
Protected areas
Nature reserves in Papua New Guinea